Castelginest (Languedocien: Castèlginèst) is a commune in the Haute-Garonne department in southwestern France.

Population

International relations
Castelginest is twinned with Ponte di Piave, Italy.

Sights

See also
Communes of the Haute-Garonne department

References

Communes of Haute-Garonne